Sylvester Webster Osborn (July 1, 1811 – November 4, 1903) was a member of the Wisconsin State Assembly.

Biography
Osborn was a native of Delaware County, New York. Reports have differed on the date of his birth. In 1835, Osborn married Julia M. Gardner. They had four children. Among them were Sarah, whose husband Philo A. Orton became a member of the Assembly, and Charles F. Osborn, who was also a member of the Assembly.

Osborn settled in Darlington, Wisconsin in 1851. During the American Civil War, he served with the 16th Wisconsin Volunteer Infantry Regiment of the Union Army, achieving the rank of captain. He died on November 4, 1903.

Political career
Osborn was a Republican member of the Assembly in 1865. In 1877, he was appointed Postmaster of Darlington.

References

People from Delaware County, New York
People from Darlington, Wisconsin
Republican Party members of the Wisconsin State Assembly
Wisconsin postmasters
People of Wisconsin in the American Civil War
Union Army officers
1811 births
1903 deaths
Burials in Wisconsin